Karnaz Subdistrict is a subdistrict (nahiya) of the Mhardeh District in Hama.  The center of this subdistrict is Karnaz. According to the Syria Central Bureau of Statistics (CBS), the Karnaz Subdistrict had a population of 25,039 in the 2004 census.

References 

Karnaz
Mahardah District